The W band of the microwave part of the electromagnetic spectrum ranges from 75 to 110 GHz, wavelength ≈2.7–4 mm. It sits above the U.S. IEEE-designated V band (40–75 GHz) in frequency, and overlaps the NATO designated M band (60–100 GHz). The W band is used for satellite communications, millimeter-wave radar research, military radar targeting and tracking applications, and some non-military applications.

Radar
A number of passive millimeter-wave cameras for concealed weapons detection operate at 94 GHz. A frequency around 77 GHz is used for automotive cruise control radar. The atmospheric radio window at 94 GHz is used for imaging millimeter-wave radar applications in astronomy, defense, and security applications.

Heat ray
Less-than-lethal weaponry exists that uses millimeter waves to heat a thin layer of human skin to an intolerable temperature so as to make the targeted person move away. A two-second burst of the 95 GHz focused beam heats the skin to a temperature of 130 °F (54 °C) at a depth of 1/64 of an inch (0.4 mm). The United States Air Force and Marines are currently using this type of Active Denial System.

Communications
In terms of communications capability, W band offers high data rate throughput when used at high altitudes and in space. (The 71–76 GHz81–86 GHz segment of the W band is allocated by the International Telecommunication Union to satellite services.) Because of increasing spectrum and orbit congestion at lower frequencies, W-band satellite allocations are of increasing interest to commercial satellite operators, although no commercial project has yet been implemented in these bands.

References

Further reading
 5th Framework Programme Information Societies Technologies (IST) - Multifunctional Automotive Radar Network (RadarNet)

External links
 A cloud radar at 94 GHz

Microwave bands